Mordecai Wyatt Johnson (January 4, 1890 – September 10, 1976) was an American educator and pastor. He served as the first African-American president of Howard University, from 1926 until 1960. Johnson has been considered one of the three leading African-American preachers of the early 20th-century, along with Vernon Johns and Howard Thurman.

Early life

Johnson was born on January 12, 1890, in Paris, Tennessee, to parents who were former slaves. His father was Reverend Wyatt J. Johnson, a preacher and mill worker. His mother, Carolyn Freeman, was a domestic worker for one of the prominent families in town.

Education

Johnson attended a small elementary school in his native town. Afterward, he moved to Nashville, where he studied at Roger Williams University. Later he studied at Howe Institute in Memphis.

He transferred to the Atlanta Baptist College (now Morehouse College, a historically black college), where he completed his secondary and undergraduate education. During his college career, he was a member of the debating team and the Glee Club, a star athlete in three sports, and quarterback of the football team. Offered a faculty position at the college upon graduation, he taught English and economics and served a year as acting dean. He maintained a profound interest in economics throughout his career, an interest that was apparent in some of his major speeches.

After one year of teaching, he continued his education at the University of Chicago, where he received a second A.B. degree, and at the Rochester Theological Seminary in Rochester, New York, where he earned the B.D. degree. At Rochester he was profoundly influenced by the great "social gospel" advocate, Walter Rauschenbusch. His experiences there strongly influenced his thinking and his entire career.

Family

Johnson married Anna Ethelyn Gardner on December 25, 1916. They had five children: Carolyn Elizabeth Johnson, Mordecai Wyatt Johnson Jr., Archer Clement Johnson, William Howard Johnson, and Anna Faith Johnson.

Career

Following a brief stint as secretary of the western region of the Student YMCA, in 1917 he became pastor of the First Baptist Church in Charleston, West Virginia.  He later founded a chapter of the National Association for the Advancement of Colored People (NAACP).

Presidency of Howard University 

On June 26, 1926, at the age of 36, Johnson was unanimously elected the eleventh President of Howard University, becoming the first African American to serve as the permanent head of that institution. Prior to his appointment Johnson had served as Professor of Economics and History at Morehouse College. He had also served as Pastor of the First Baptist Church in Charleston, West Virginia.

During his tenure, Johnson appointed Charles Hamilton Houston as dean of the law school, who played a significant role in dismantling the Jim Crow laws.

Johnson raised millions of dollars for new buildings and for upgrading all of the schools. National honor societies, including Phi Beta Kappa, were established on the campus of Howard.

During his administration, it was said that Howard had the greatest collection of African American scholars to be found anywhere. Notable scholars at Howard included:

 Alain LeRoy Locke, graduated from English and Philosophy at Harvard, and was the first African American Rhodes Scholar,
 Ralph Bunche, professor of political science and later a Nobel Laureate;
 Charles R. Drew, who perfected the use of blood plasma; 
 Percy Lavon Julian, a noted chemist; and
 Sterling Allen Brown, professor of English and noted Harlem Renaissance poet.

Johnson brought Howard university into national prominence and served as president of Howard for 34 years, since 1926 until his retirement in 1960. In this time the enrollment at Howard University increased from 2,000 in 1926 to more than 10,000 in 1960.

Johnson the Orator

Johnson was an annual speaker for the Education Night at the National Baptist Convention, a speaker at the Ford Hall Forum in Boston, and spoke alongside Martin Luther King Jr. and others at the 1957 Prayer Pilgrimage for Freedom. He traveled 25,000 miles a year throughout the country speaking principally on topics such as racism, segregation, and discrimination.  In 1951 he was a member of the American delegation to the NATO meetings in London.

Awards and recognitions

In 1929, the National Association for the Advancement of Colored People (NAACP) awarded Johnson the Spingarn Medal (its highest honor at that time), for Johnson's ability to secure annual federal funds to support the university's financial future.

Death

Johnson died on September 10, 1976, at the age of 86, in Washington, D.C.

References

Yenser, Thomas (editor), Who's Who in Colored America: A Biographical Dictionary of Notable Living Persons of African Descent in America, Brooklyn, New York, 1930-1931-1932 (third edition)

1890 births
1976 deaths
Morehouse College alumni
University of Chicago alumni
Howard University alumni
Harvard University alumni
Interdenominational Theological Center alumni
Presidents of Howard University
Spingarn Medal winners
African-American academics
People from Paris, Tennessee
Colgate Rochester Crozer Divinity School alumni
Religious leaders from Charleston, West Virginia
20th-century African-American educators
20th-century American academics